The Tengah Air Base  is a military airbase of the Republic of Singapore Air Force (RSAF) located in the Western Water Catchment, in the western part of Singapore. 

The air base is the most important airfield of the RSAF as it houses the majority of the RSAF's fixed-wing frontline squadrons, home to all of RSAF's Airborne early warning and control (AEWC) assets, most of the F-16C/D Fighting Falcons and many UAVs. 

The airfield goes by the motto of Always Vigilant, which is supported by its main motif, a black knight chess piece symbolising the aircraft's operational readiness in Tengah. The sword represents war's heraldic sword of destruction, while the state is depicted by the castle.

Prior to Singapore's independence, it was a flying Royal Air Force station known as RAF Tengah.

History

RAF Tengah

RAF Tengah was opened in 1939.  Tengah airfield was the target of carpet bombing when 17 Japanese Navy bombers conducted the first air raid on Singapore, shortly after the Battle of Malaya began.

In a 1990 memoir, former Royal Air Force (RAF) pilot Terence O'Brien described leading (in late December 1941) a flight of Lockheed Hudsons from Britain to Singapore, which was already under attack by the time he and his aircrews arrived at Tengah.  He noted that only eight "of us out of the twenty who set off" from Britain for Singapore survived the Far East campaign. Tengah had already been under air attack by the Japanese, but he said it was easy to imagine the once elegant, but now badly damaged, officers' mess just a few weeks before their arrival. He said it:
 
. . . stood proud on a grassy slope to the south of the field, from the terrace you looked over the lush green grass, then a smooth-topped expanse of rubber plantation stretched away to misty blue hills . . . You could picture officers and guests out there on mess nights chatting under the Southern Cross . . . the strains of a waltz coming from the dance band in the spacious lounge brilliantly lit and aswirl in colour.  Now, a month later and into war, all that was gone forever. Many of the windows were now empty of glass, so the rain came misting through in the frequent tropical showers . . . There was no longer any door at all on the room allotted to Peter and me . . . 

Not long after their arrival, O'Brien and his Hudsons departed Singapore just ahead of the conquering Japanese.

Tengah was the first airfield to be captured when Japanese forces invaded Singapore.  After the Japanese completed their capture of Singapore, Tengah came under the control of the Imperial Japanese Army Air Force while the Imperial Japanese Navy Air Service took over the other two RAF stations of Sembawang Air Base and RAF Seletar as Singapore was split into north–south sphere of control. This effectively ensured that the Japanese Army took control of the south, including the administrative hub and population centre of Singapore City, while the Japanese Navy took command of the north, which included the Royal Navy dockyard at Sembawang.

Malayan Emergency
During the Malayan Emergency, Tengah was used to house Avro Lincolns of the RAF and Royal Australian Air Force and Bristol Brigands of No. 84 Squadron RAF which performed bombing sorties against pro-independence forces led by the Malayan National Liberation Army (MNLA), led by the Malayan Communist Party (MCP) deep in the jungles of Peninsular Malaysia. In 1952 45 Squadron was equipped with de Havilland Hornets and re-equipped with Venoms in 1955 at RAF Butterworth when it was amalgamated with 33 Squadron] T.11's of 60 Squadron, joined by 14 Squadron of the Royal New Zealand Air Force.  In 1958 they were joined by 45 Squadron and No. 75 Squadron RNZAF, both equipped with English Electric Canberra B.2.  The RAAF retained their Lincolns, with 1 Squadron, until the end of the emergency.

Konfrontasi

During the period of Indonesia–Malaysia confrontation, 20 Squadron with its Hawker Hunter fighter aircraft in addition to the Gloster Javelins of 60 Squadron and 64 Squadron, were based on the airfield to help upgrade the air defence of Singapore and Peninsula Malaysia against infrequent air incursions from the MiG-21s and P-51 Mustangs of the Indonesian Air Force. 74 Squadron Lightnings were deployed following Confrontation to replace the Javelins of 64 Squadron.

On 3 September 1964, an Indonesian Air Force C-130 Hercules crashed into the Straits of Malacca while trying to evade interception by a Javelin FAW.9 of No 60 Squadron. On 30 April 1968, the Gloster Javelins of No 60 Squadron flew their last RAF operational sorties from Tengah and the squadron was disbanded the same day.

V bomber detachment

As a show of force to deter the Indonesian President Sukarno from launching an all-out war during this period, the RAF also deployed a V bomber force detachment to Tengah in the form of Handley Page Victor B.1A bombers from 15 Squadron in August 1963, which was rotated with those dispersed to RAAF Butterworth in Malaysia. The detachment of Victor bombers was replaced in October 1964 by a detachment of Avro Vulcan B.2 bombers from 12 Squadron, these were subsequently pulled back to RAF Cottesmore in December that same year. In August 1965, 9 Squadron resumed RAF's Vulcan bomber detachment to Tengah, followed by 35 Squadron in December 1965, these were in turn replaced by 9 Squadron again in February 1966. After June 1966, 9 Squadron returned to Cottesmore following the end of the confrontation.

According to British MoD documents declassified in 2000, up to 48 Red Beard tactical nuclear weapons were secretly stowed in a highly secured weapons storage facility at Tengah, between 1962 and 1970, for possible use by the V bomber force detachment and 45 Sqn Canberras for Britain's military commitment to South East Asia Treaty Organization (SEATO).

British Withdrawal
The RAF station closed at the end of March 1971 and Tengah was handed over to the Singapore Air Defence Command (later the Republic of Singapore Air Force) by 1973, after the British Withdrawal following the defence cuts. Despite this, the airfield continued to host British and Commonwealth air forces and troops under the auspices of the Five Power Defence Arrangements (FPDA) until 1976. The RAAF pulled out of Tengah in 1983.

Tengah Air Base
It was renamed RSAF Tengah in 1971 (then it became Tengah Air Base (TAB)), when it was handed over to the Singapore Air Defence Command (SADC). Currently, the air base houses aircraft such as the Lockheed Martin F-16C/D Fighting Falcons.

RSAF50 parade took place on 1 September 2018 at TAB. The parade featured almost 500 personnel in a march-past, mobile column and a Salute-to-the-Nation flypast involving 20 aircraft. The new Multi-Role Tanker Transport (MRTT) aircraft made its maiden public appearance. The static display also showcased both retired and present aircraft.

Organization

Flying Squadrons
The Flying Squadrons based in Tengah Air Base are:
111 Squadron with 4 G550 CAEW
140 Squadron with 12 F-16C/D
143 Squadron with 12 F-16C/D
RSAF Black Knights – the official RSAF Aerobatic team with F-16Cs from various squadrons.

UAV Squadrons 
The Flying Squadrons based in Tengah Air Base are:
116 Squadron with H-450

Support Squadrons 
The Support Squadrons based in Tengah Air Base are:

Flying Support Squadron – 205 Squadron
Airbase Civil Engineering Squadron – 505 Squadron
Field Defence Squadron – 605 Squadron
Ground Logistics Squadron – 705 Squadron
Aircraft Operational Maintenance Squadron – 805 Squadron
Aircraft Specialist Maintenance Squadron – 815 Squadron

Former Flying Squadrons
142 Squadron with 16 A-4SU Super Skyhawk before the squadron was disbanded in 1997. The squadron was reestablished in 2016 at Paya Lebar Air Base.

Exercises
The RSAF regularly conducts Exercise Torrent which converts the neighboring Lim Chu Kang road into an alternative runway since its inception in April 1986. Its purpose is to demonstrate the RSAF capability of generating air power in the shortest time from public roads. The latest and seventh edition was held from the 10 to 13 November 2016.

Future
To accommodate the relocation of all RSAF assets and equipment from Paya Lebar Air Base, Tengah Air Base will be expanded by acquiring 50,000 graves in the Choa Chu Kang Cemetery and 80 neighbouring farms/agricultural businesses. Military training areas will be rationalised, such as the closure of Murai Urban Training Facility. A new runway will be built on the expanded portion of the base.

Photo gallery

See also
Republic of Singapore Air Force
Singapore strategy
British Far East Command
Far East Air Force (Royal Air Force)
Far East Strategic Reserve
Former overseas RAF bases
Battle of Singapore
Malayan Emergency
 Bristol Brigands - No 84 Squadron at RAF Tengah during the Malayan Emergency
Indonesia–Malaysia confrontation

References
Citations

Bibliography

Wixley, Kenneth E. "Gloster Javelin: a production history, Part 2". Aircraft Illustrated, September 1984, Vol. 17, No 9, pp. 420–422. .

External links

RSAF web page on Tengah Air Base (TAB)
History of RAF
Crest badge and Information of RAF Tengah
 The Brigand Boys at RAF Tengah
Memories of Singapore – RAF Tengah

Video clips
, accessed 26 December 2008.
, accessed 23 January 2009.

Airports in Singapore
Camps and bases of the Singapore Armed Forces
Military of Singapore under British rule
Tengah
Republic of Singapore Air Force bases